More Grand Piano is a 1986 studio album by the pianist George Shearing, the sequel to his 1985 album Grand Piano.

Track listing 
 "My Silent Love" (Edward Heyman, Dana Suesse) – 4:19
 "Change Partners" (Irving Berlin) – 4:49
 "My Favorite Things" (Oscar Hammerstein II, Richard Rodgers) – 2:59
 "You Don't Know What Love Is" (Gene de Paul, Don Raye) – 4:59
 "Ramona" (L. Wolfe Gilbert, Mabel Wayne) – 2:14
 "I Didn't Know What Time It Was" (Lorenz Hart, Richard Rodgers) – 7:02
 "People" (Jule Styne, Bob Merrill) – 4:50
 "East of the Sun (and West of the Moon)" (Brooks Bowman) – 4:10
 "I Can't Get Started" (Vernon Duke, Ira Gershwin) – 4:19
 "Dream" (Johnny Mercer) – 3:10
 "Wind in the Willow" (Marvin Fisher, Jack Segal) – 5:25

Personnel

Performance 
 George Shearing – piano

References 

1986 albums
George Shearing albums
Albums produced by Carl Jefferson
Concord Records albums
Solo piano jazz albums